The Potters is a lost 1927 American silent comedy film produced by Famous Players-Lasky and distributed by Paramount Pictures. It was directed by Fred C. Newmeyer and starred comedian W. C. Fields. It is based on a play by J. P. McEvoy which had a respectable run on Broadway in the 1923–24 season.

Cast
W. C. Fields as Pa Potter
Mary Alden as Ma Potter
Ivy Harris as Mamie
Jack Egan as Bill
Richard "Skeets" Gallagher as Red Miller
Joseph W. Smiley as Rankin
Bradley Barker as Eagle

References

External links

Still at silentfilmstillarchive.com

1927 films
American silent feature films
Lost American films
Films directed by Fred C. Newmeyer
Paramount Pictures films
American films based on plays
1927 comedy films
Silent American comedy films
American black-and-white films
Lost comedy films
1927 lost films
1920s American films